The 2014–15 season was Ergotelis' 85th season in existence, 9th season in the Super League Greece, and the second consecutive season in the top tier since the club's latest promotion from the Football League. Ergotelis also participated in the Greek cup, entering the competition in the Second Round. After a turbulent season, with many managerial changes, player transfers, multiple matches being postponed in mid-season and competitors withdrawing from the league, Ergotelis was relegated after finishing in 16th place during the regular season. The club ultimately was placed in 15th place post-season, after Kerkyra was relegated for illegal transfer of shares. Kerkyra was given the last position of the league table, while Ergotelis' relegation status remained unchanged.

Players

The following players have departed in mid-season 

Note: Flags indicate national team as has been defined under FIFA eligibility rules. Players and Managers may hold more than one non-FIFA nationality.

Transfers

In

Promoted from youth system

Total spending:  Undisclosed

Out 
 
Total income:  0.00 €

Expenditure:   Undisclosed

Managerial changes

Pre-season and friendlies

Pre-season friendlies

Mid-season friendlies

Competitions

Overview 

Last updated: 2 July 2014

Super League Greece

League table

Results summary

Matches 

1. Matchday 6 vs. OFI, originally meant to be held October 4, 2014, was postponed until December 4, 2014 via a direct decision of the Deputy Minister of Culture and Sport, Giannis Andrianos in response to the murder of Ethnikos Piraeus fan Kostas Katsoulis in the municipal Nea Alikarnassos Stadium during the Football League 2 match vs. Irodotos. 
2. Matchday 11 vs. Panathinaikos, originally meant to be held November 23, 2014, was postponed until January 11, 2015 after the Hellenic Football Federation decided not to appoint referees for all domestic league and cup matches in response to a violent attack versus its member Christoforos Zografos. 
3. Matchday 21 vs. Niki Volos, originally meant to be held February 1, 2015, was awarded to Ergotelis (3-0), due to Niki Volos withdrawing from the league.
4. Matchday 18 vs. Panionios, originally meant to be held January 14, 2015, was postponed until February 18, 2015 due to safety regulations, after the Pankritio Stadium suffered severe damages due to extreme weather conditions in Heraklion.
5. After a second wave of severe weather conditions in Heraklion, which caused more damage to the Pankritio Stadium's awning, the Home games vs. Panionios (18-02-2015) and Atromitos (23-02-2015) were held at the local Theodoros Vardinogiannis Stadium.
6. Matchday 26 vs. PAOK, originally meant to be held February 28, 2015, was postponed via a direct decision of the Deputy Minister of Culture and Sport, Stavros Kontonis after a violent outbreak of fans at Apostolos Nikolaidis Stadium during the derby of the eternal enemies.

Greek Cup

Second round

Group F

Matches

Statistics

Goal scorers

Last updated: 22 September 2014

References

Ergotelis
Ergotelis F.C. seasons